The Princeton Tigers represent Princeton University in ECAC women's ice hockey during the 2019–20 NCAA Division I women's ice hockey season. Resulting in a program-record 26 wins, the Tigers also experienced a pair of historic firsts, winning its first ECAC tournament title, and an NCAA tournament berth for the second consecutive year. On April 4, 2020, the Tigers had announced captains for the 2020-21 season, since cancelled. Sarah Filler earned the honor of the captaincy, while Sharon Frankel and Shannon Griffin were appointed alternate captains.

Offseason

Recruiting

Schedule
Source:

|-
!colspan=12 style="  "| Regular Season
|-

|-
!colspan=12 style="  "| ECAC Tournament
|-

Roster

2019-20 Tigers

Awards and honors
Carly Bullock, Women's Hockey Commissioners Association Player of the Month February 2020

All-USCHO
Carly Bullock, All-USCHO National Honors 
Sarah Fillier, All-USCHO National Honors

Team awards
Elizabeth English Trophy: Carly Bullock
Princeton Patty Kazmaier Award: Claire Thompson
Rookie of the Year: Kate Monihan
Unsung Hero Award: MacKenzie Ebel

AHCA All-America Scholar
The following Tigers were recognized by the American Hockey Coaches Association as All-America Scholars

MacKenzie Ebel
Sharon Frankel
Claire Thompson, Senior
Sylvie Wallin

All-Ivy honorees 
First Team All-Ivy
Sarah Fillier, Princeton  
Carly Bullock, Princeton
Second Team All-Ivy
Maggie Connors, Princeton
Claire Thompson, Princeton

References

 
Princeton Tigers